Trinity Episcopal Church is a historic Episcopal church at 44 N. 2nd Street in Ashland, Oregon. It is also the oldest church in Ashland. Constructed in 1894 and completed in 1895, its design was based on drawings by local builder W. J. Schmidt. Built in the Gothic Revival style, it features a pitched gable roof, a pointed west-facing window, a gabled south-facing porch, and a trussed rafter roof. The church was added to the National Register of Historic Places in 1984.

It was included again on the National Register in 2000 as a contributing building in the Ashland Downtown Historic District.

References

External links

Episcopal churches in Oregon
Churches on the National Register of Historic Places in Oregon
Carpenter Gothic church buildings in Oregon
Churches completed in 1894
Buildings and structures in Ashland, Oregon
1894 establishments in Oregon
Historic district contributing properties in Oregon
19th-century Episcopal church buildings
National Register of Historic Places in Jackson County, Oregon
Ashland Downtown Historic District